Rafael Daniel (born December 12, 1983 in São Paulo) is a Brazilian racing driver. He has raced in such series as Stock Car Brasil and FIA GT1 World Championship. He won the Stock Car Brasil second tier in 2009, 2011 and 2012.

Racing record

Career summary

Complete GT1 World Championship results

Complete Stock Car Brasil results

External links
 

1983 births
Living people
Brazilian racing drivers
Stock Car Brasil drivers
Racing drivers from São Paulo
FIA GT Championship drivers